Hacıyakup can refer to the following villages in Turkey:

 Hacıyakup, Gölyaka
 Hacıyakup, Manyas
 Hacıyakup, Merzifon